Castle Films was a film company founded in California by former newsreel cameraman Eugene W. Castle (1897–1960) in 1924. Originally, Castle Films produced industrial and advertising films.  Then in 1937, the company pioneered the production and distribution of 8mm and 16mm films for home projection. It became a subsidiary of Universal Pictures and was eventually renamed Universal 8 from 1977 before folding in the early 1980s due to competition from home video.

History
Castle Films originally produced business and advertising films. By 1931 it had moved its principal office to New York City.

In 1937, Castle branched out into 8 mm and 16 mm home movies, buying newsreel footage and old theatrical films for home use. Castle's first home movie was a newsreel of the Hindenburg explosion. That same year, Castle launched his "News Parade" series, a year-in-review newsreel; travelogues followed in 1938. Castle also eventually compiled sports films, animal adventures, and "old time" movies excerpted from silent theatrical films. The films were all issued as one-reel entities, running about 9 minutes, affordably priced and box packaged.  The films were sold at camera shops, in department stores, and by mail-order catalog. Castle Films were extensively advertised in national magazines. 

Castle obtained home-movie rights to cartoons from several animation studios, including Terrytoons (1938) and Ub Iwerks (1941). During World War II it produced numerous documentary and training films for the U.S. armed services.  In the late 1940s and early 1950s, Castle released a series of 16 mm "Music Albums" assembled from the Soundies musical shorts, combining three 3-minute songs into each nine-minute subject.

Castle Films distributed two dozen Christmas subjects over two decades, the first being Christmas-Time in Toyland (released in 1939) and the last The First Christmas (in 1959). The perennial in this category was The Night Before Christmas, a live-action dramatization of the poem; this 1946 release remained in print for 26 years.

Subsidiary of Universal
In 1947, United World Films, Inc., the non-theatrical subsidiary of Universal Pictures, purchased a majority stake in Castle Films. Castle Films thus became the brand name of the United World subsidiary, and began drawing upon Universal's library of vintage films (with Abbott and Costello, W. C. Fields, Boris Karloff, James Stewart, etc.). The merger with Universal also brought to Castle the Walter Lantz cartoons with Woody Woodpecker, Andy Panda, Oswald Rabbit, and Chilly Willy. In the 1950s, Castle released a highly successful series of Hopalong Cassidy excerpts, licensed from the series' star William Boyd. When Universal was purchased by MCA Inc. in 1962, Castle also gained access to the pre-1950 Paramount Pictures sound feature films owned by MCA's TV division, releasing sequences from Cecil B. DeMille's spectaculars and Marx Brothers comedies, among other Paramount titles. Newsreels edited from NASA footage of U.S. space flights were timely in the 1960s. Castle's most popular series was its line of science-fiction and horror films, many featuring the Universal Classic Monsters Dracula, Frankenstein, The Wolf Man, The Mummy, Creature from the Black Lagoon, and The Invisible Man. The series launched in 1957 and grew to 30 titles.

Name change, decline and closing
Castle Films' name was changed to Universal 8 in 1977 and the new management experimented with longer-length films, but the era of home video brought an end to Universal's home-movie enterprise in 1984. Universal 8 dealt mostly in excerpts, but Universal Pictures Home Entertainment (founded in 1980) offered feature films in their entirety on videotape. Collectors abandoned the excerpts in favor of the complete movies.

Competitors
The largest U.S. competitor of Castle Films was Official Films, until rival movie studios entered the marketplace, including Columbia Pictures and Warner Bros., and United Artists and 20th Century-Fox (both under the Ken Films brand name).

Legacy
The complete inventory of Castle Films (more than 1,000 titles over 40 years) is listed in Scott MacGillivray's book Castle Films: A Hobbyist's Guide, .

See also
 The News Parade of the Year 1942
 Official Films

References

External links 
 Author Mark Evanier's in-depth history of Castle Films, plus cover gallery
 

Film distributors of the United States
Universal Pictures
Defunct mass media companies of the United States
Entertainment companies based in California
Mass media companies established in 1924
1924 establishments in California
Defunct companies based in New York City
Articles containing video clips